This is a list of moths of the family Uraniidae that are found in India. It also acts as an index to the species articles and forms part of the full List of moths of India. This list is incomplete.

Subfamily Auzeinae
Decetia numicusaria (Walker, 1860)
Decetia subobscurata Walker, 1862

Subfamily Epipleminae
Chundana emarginata (Hampson, 1891)
Dysaethria erasaria (Christoph, 1881)
Dysaethria flavistriga (Warren, 1901)
Dysaethria grisea (Warren, 1896)
Dysaethria lilacina (Moore, [1887])
Dysaethra quadricaudata (Walker, 1861)
Epiplema fulvilinea Hampson, 1895
Epiplema fuscifrons (Warren, 1896)
Epiplema himala (Butler, 1880)
Epiplema rhacina Swinhoe, 1917
Europlema conchiferata (Moore, 1887)
Europlema desistaria (Walker, 1861)
Europlema irrorata (Moore, 1887)
Europlema semibrunnea (Pagenstecher, 1884)
Eversmannia exornata (Eversmann, 1837)
Monobolodes prunaria (Moore, [1887])
Oroplema oyamana (Matsumura, 1931)
Oroplema plagifera (Butler, 1881)
Oroplema simplex (Warren, 1899)
Orudiza protheclaria Walker, 1861
Phazaca erosioides Walker, 1863
Phazaca leucocera (Hampson, 1891)
Phazaca theclata (Guenée, 1857)
Phazaca unicauda (Dudgeon, 1905)
Pseudhyria rubra (Hampson, 1891)
Rhombophylla edentata (Hampson, 1895)
Rhombophylla rectimarginata (Hampson, 1902)

Subfamily Microniinae
Acropteris ciniferaria (Walker, 1866)
Micronia aculeata Guenée, 1857
Pseudomicronia advocataria (Walker, 1861)
Pseudomicronia fraterna Moore
Strophidia caudata (Fabricius, 1781)

Subfamily Uraniinae
Urapteroides astheniata (Guenée, 1857)

See also
Uraniidae
List of moths of India

References

Markku Savela's ftp.funet.fi
Sohn & Yen, 2005. A Taxonomic Revision of the Korean Epipleminae (Lepidoptera: Uraniidae), with Phylogenetic Comments on the Involved Genera. - Zoological Studies 44(1):44-70

 

M